168 Shopping Mall is a shopping complex in Binondo, Manila, the Chinatown of the Philippines. The three-story complex is located along St. Elena and Soler Streets just south of Recto Avenue and Divisoria. It is owned and managed by the 168 Group of Companies. Close competitors to the mall are the 11/88 Mall, the 999 Mall, and the Lucky Chinatown Mall. The building houses over 500 tenants and is considered to be one of the most visited malls in the area, before the opening of the Lucky Chinatown Mall in 2012.

It is still one of the common destinations when shopping for bargain goods and other commodities, from novelty items, bags, shoes, toys, hardware, RTW's, and others.

History
The mall began its operations in September 2005 and was developed by the Yeeloofa Development Corporation (YDC) costing somewhere around 250 million pesos. Being developed by the 168 Group of Companies (168 GoC), the 168 Shopping Mall is only one of many buildings being managed and constructed by the group. Within recent years, Phase 2 of the mall was constructed to accommodate the need for extra space due to the overcrowding in the first phase of the mall and the need of space for tenants.

Tenants

Located on the first level are some banks like Security Bank and BDO and some men's and women's apparel and accessories boutiques as well.

A Robinsons Supermarket branch is located at the lower ground level.

Continuing on the trend of the boutiques, infant's and children's toys, apparel and accessories can be found throughout the succeeding levels; gifts and decorations, and some food stalls are found here. A food court could be found on the third level and on the fifth level, respectively.

A subsidiary of the 168 Group of Companies, the 168 Department Store, is located within the mall complex.

Anchors
 168 Department Store
 LBC

References

Shopping malls in Manila
Buildings and structures in Binondo